Spectrum Safari is a ZX Spectrum video game developed and self-released by A.J. Rushton in 1983. The game was soon signed by CDS Micro Systems who reissued it in early 1984 with a new cover and loading screen.

Its cassette inlay simply read: "Can you lead your party of three away from the dangers of the Island of Death, or will you be beaten by the horrific creatures that inhabit the island, who thirst for your blood with every step you take? Only the fittest will survive."

Summary
"The idea is to take your party of stranded explorers across an island infested with highly intelligent wildlife with university degrees, and beset with natives who want to barter away their food and men to replace that eaten by the men or the intelligent wildlife. Once you have visited a village it disappears forever, but it teaches you caution in your bargaining, if you’re getting short of explorers (lives) in your party. Losing them all means death to the player. The main object is to find the only boat, buy it and sail away from this Magnus Magnusson madhouse. Every animal encountered has some problem for you; sometimes it’s an arcade style situation, sometimes they want to know the answer to a difficult mathematical problem. If you fail a member of your party gets eaten."

Reception
Your Spectrum opined: "This is a collection of bad 'magazine type' programs thrown together, with less than spectacular graphics and an average choice of colours. And because it's written in BASIC, it's not particularly fast."

Conversely, Crash wrote: "Nice clear graphics and a veritable MGM musical score makes this a very enjoyable game. Recommended."

References

External links
 

1983 video games
Video games developed in the United Kingdom
ZX Spectrum games
ZX Spectrum-only games
CDS Software games